is a railway station  in the city of Hachinohe, Aomori Prefecture, Japan, operated by East Japan Railway Company (JR East).

Lines
Konakano Station is served by the Hachinohe Line, and is 7.3 kilometers from the starting point of the line at Hachinohe Station.

Station layout
The station has a single elevated side platform serving one bi-directional track, with the station building located underneath. The station is unattended.

History
Konakano Station opened on June 1, 1934 as a station on the Japanese Government Railways (JGR). With the privatization of Japanese National Railways (JNR, the successor to JGR) on April 1, 1987, it came under the operational control of JR East. It has been unattended since December 10, 2005.

Surrounding area
Hachinohe Omachi Post Office

See also
 List of Railway Stations in Japan

External links

  

Railway stations in Aomori Prefecture
Railway stations in Japan opened in 1934
Hachinohe Line
Hachinohe
Stations of East Japan Railway Company